Keith Barbour (born January 21, 1941) is an American singer-songwriter and actor who was a member of the Jabberwocks and New Christy Minstrels.

Career 
He was a member of the Jabberwocks, Brown University's oldest male a cappella group, while in college. He was later a member of the New Christy Minstrels before signing to Epic Records as a solo artist in 1969. He released an album, Echo Park, in 1969, which hit No. 163 on the Billboard 200, and the title track, written by Buzz Clifford, hit No. 40 on the Pop Singles chart. He had a follow-up single, "My God and I" in November 1970.

Personal life 
Barbour was married to TV soap actress Deidre Hall from 1971 to 1978.

Filmography

Television

References

1941 births
Epic Records artists
Living people
Singer-songwriters from New York (state)
The New Christy Minstrels members